This is a list of schools in Cardiff in Wales. It includes state schools, independent schools and further education colleges that provide sixth form education.

CW is an abbreviation for Church in Wales and RC for Roman Catholic.

State English-medium primary schools

Adamsdown Primary School
Albany Primary School
All Saints CW Primary School
Allensbank Primary School
Baden Powell Primary School
Birchgrove Primary School
Bishop Childs CW Primary School
Bryn Celyn Primary School
Bryn Deri Primary School
Bryn Hafod Primary School
Christ The King RC Primary School
Coed Glas Primary School
Coryton Primary School
Danescourt Primary School
Fairwater Primary School
Gabalfa Primary School
Gladstone Primary School
Glan-Yr-Afon Primary School
Glyncoed Primary School
Grangetown Primary School
Greenway Primary School
Hawthorn Primary School
Herbert Thompson Primary School
Holy Family RC Primary School
Hywel Dda Primary School
Kitchener Primary School
Lakeside Primary School
Lansdowne Primary School
Llandaff CW Primary School
Llanedeyrn Primary School
Llanishen Fach Primary School
Llysfaen Primary School
Marlborough Primary School
Meadowlane Primary School
Millbank Primary School
Moorland Primary School
Mount Stuart Primary School
Ninian Park Primary School
Oakfield Primary School
Pen-Y-Bryn Primary School
Pencaerau Primary School
Pentrebane Primary School
Pentyrch Primary School
Peter Lea Primary School
Pontprennau Primary School
Radnor Primary School
Radyr Primary School
Rhiwbina Primary School
Rhydypenau Primary School
Roath Park Primary School
Rumney Primary School
Severn Primary School
Springwood Primary School
St Alban's RC Primary School
St Bernadette's RC Primary School
St Cadoc's RC Primary School
St Cuthbert's RC Primary School
St David's CW Primary School
St Fagan's CW Primary School
St Francis RC Primary School
St John Lloyd RC Primary School
St Joseph's RC Primary School
St Mary The Virgin CW Primary School
St Mary's RC Primary School
St Mellons CW Primary School
St Monica's CW Primary School
St Patrick's RC Primary School
St Paul's CW Primary School
St Peter's RC Primary School
St Philip Evans RC Primary School
Stacey Primary School
Thornhill Primary School
Ton-Yr-Ywen Primary School
Tongwynlais Primary School
Tredegarville C.W Primary School
Trelai Primary School
Trowbridge Primary School
Whitchurch Primary School
Willowbrook Primary School
Windsor Clive Primary School

State Welsh-medium primary schools 

Ysgol Bro Eirwg
Ysgol Glan Ceubal
Ysgol Glan Morfa
Ysgol Gymraeg Coed-Y-Gof
Ysgol Gymraeg Melin Gruffydd
Ysgol Gymraeg Nant Caerau
Ysgol Gymraeg Pwll Coch
Ysgol Gymraeg Treganna
Ysgol Gynradd Gymraeg Hamadryad
Ysgol Gynradd Gymraeg Pen-y-Groes
Ysgol Mynydd Bychan
Ysgol Pen Y Pil
Ysgol Pencae
Ysgol Y Berllan Deg
Ysgol Y Wern

State dual-stream (English and Welsh) primary schools
Creigiau Primary School
Ysgol Gynradd Gwaelod Y Garth

State English-medium secondary schools
Bishop of Llandaff CW High School 
Cantonian High School
Cardiff High School
Cardiff West Community High School
Cathays High School
Corpus Christi RC High School* (does not have a sixth form)
Eastern High School*
Fitzalan High School
Llanishen High School
Mary Immaculate High School*
Radyr Comprehensive School
St Illtyd's Catholic High School*
St Teilo's CW High School*
Whitchurch High School 
Willows High School (does not have a Sixth Form)

State Welsh-medium secondary schools 
Ysgol Gyfun Gymraeg Bro Edern, Penylan
Ysgol Gyfun Gymraeg Glantaf, Llandaff North
Ysgol Gyfun Gymraeg Plasmawr, Fairwater

Independent schools
Cardiff Steiner School, Llandaff North
Cardiff Muslim Primary School, Cathays 
Howell's School
Kings Monkton School
Llandaff Cathedral School
St John's College
Cardiff Sixth Form College, Newport Road

State special schools
Ty Gwyn Special School
Riverbank School
Meadowbank School 
The Hollies School
The Court School 
Woodlands High School
Greenhill School
Red Rose School

Independent special schools 
 Ty Coryton School
 Craig y Parc School

Further and higher education establishments 
 Cardiff and Vale College
 Royal Welsh College of Music & Drama
 St David's Catholic College
 Cardiff Metropolitan University
 Cardiff University
 University of South Wales

Defunct schools and colleges
 Howardian High School – a secondary school originating in 1885, closed in 1990
 Llanrumney High School – closed in 2013 and merged with Rumney High School to create Eastern High School
 Llanedeyrn High School – closed in 2014 and its pupils dispersed to Llanishen High School or Cardiff High School
 Glyn Derw High School - closed in 2017 to make way for Cardiff West Community High School
 Michaelstone Community College - also closed in 2017 to make way for Cardiff West Community High School
 Taibah School
 St. Michael's College, Llandaff

References

 
Cardiff
Schools